Death and the Dervish (Serbo-Croatian: Derviš i smrt / Дервиш и смрт) is a novel by Meša Selimović,  published in 1966. The novel was made into a 1974 feature-length film of the same name.

Plot

Sheikh Nuruddin is a respected dervish in an Islamic monastery in eighteenth century Bosnia. He learns his brother Harun has been arrested by the Ottoman authorities but he struggles to determine exactly what happened and what he should do. He narrates the story as a kind of elaborate suicide note “from a need stronger than benefit or reason” and regularly misquotes (or misunderstands) the Quran, the sacred scriptures of his faith. Slowly the Sheikh starts to probe and question society, power and life in general. Speaking the truth leads to his being physically assaulted in the streets and even arrested briefly. Ultimately he fights and challenges the injustice of the world by employing deceit which succeeds at the expense of innocent life. Nuruddin replaces the old Kadı but  is in turn corrupted by the need to uphold the original deceit.

Principal characters
 Sheikh Ahmed Nuruddin—the protagonist who is a religious everyman. His name Ahmed means friend in Arabic, whilst Nuruddin means “light of the Religion”.
 Hasan—Nuruddin’s principal friend outside the tekke. 
 Mullah Yusuf—the young student Nuruddin has brought into the tekke as an orphan, who spies on him for outside interests.

Subject Matter
The principal theme of Death and the Dervish is “malodušnost,” a Bosnian word meaning diminished or reduced soul (translates as faint-heartedness, cowardice or indifference). The most popular interpretation of this popular novel is that Selimović employed a fictional Ottoman setting to obscure a real critique of life in Communist Yugoslavia. Another important component is the fact that the story reflects a real-life incident in the author’s own life, when his brother, an ardent Communist functionary, was imprisoned and executed by Communist authorities after the war as an example to others for a very minor offense.

References

Bosnia and Herzegovina culture
Bosnia and Herzegovina literature
Novels set in Yugoslavia
Historical novels
Dervish
1966 novels
Novels set in the Ottoman Empire
Novels adapted into films